Surfing at the Summer Olympics made its debut in the 2020 Summer Olympics in Tokyo, Japan. The Olympics was originally scheduled to be held in 2020, but was postponed to 2021 as a result of the COVID-19 pandemic.

Setting
In 2018, the International Surfing Association (ISA) announced that surfing at the 2020 Summer Olympics would take place in the ocean, and not in an artificial wave pool. The contest site for the 2020 Games was announced to be Tsurigasaki Beach located about  outside of Tokyo in Ichinomiya, Chiba. To ensure quality surf, the contest will feature a waiting period of 16 days. Once the event runs, it will take two days to finish the competition.

Competition structure 
The 2020 Summer Olympics will use a four-person heat structure. Four athletes will compete at any given time. The best two of each heat will continue to the next round. Each heat will run for 20 to 25 minutes, with their top two scores being used.

Only one rider may ride a wave at any given time, using a common surfing etiquette rule where the surfer who is closest to the peak has right of way. Any interference with the surfer who has right of way can incur a penalty and result in point deductions.

A panel of judges will determine each rider's performance from wave to wave, scoring from one to ten with two decimals. e.g. 8.51. Scores are based on the difficulty of manoeuvres performed. This includes speed, power, and flow of each manoeuvre.

Bid for inclusion
On 28 September 2015, surfing was featured on a shortlist along with baseball, softball, skateboarding, karate, and sport climbing to be considered for inclusion in the 2020 Summer Olympics. On 3 August 2016 the International Olympic Committee voted to include all five sports (counting baseball and softball as a single sport) for inclusion in the 2020 Games. One of the biggest obstacles for surfing to be included in the Olympics for many years was in the event of a landlocked country hosting the games which would make surfing difficult to take place (compared to sailing which can take place at a lake, surfing requires an ocean current with waves) and another one was that drowning is one of the big risks in surfing, and the IOC was less likely to take high liabilities in the event of a death.

Number of participants
There will be 20 men, and 20 women competing in the 2020 Summer Olympics, This is currently limited to high-performance shortboards only, separated into categories of gender. If surfing is included in upcoming games such as Paris 2024 or Los Angeles 2028, other categories such as Longboarding, bodyboarding and SUP may be included.

Qualification

Quota places will be allocated to the athletes at the following events:
 Host Country: Japan as host country is allocated 1 place in both men's and women's events.  If at least one Japanese surfer has earned a qualification place through other events, the relevant Host Country Place(s) shall be reallocated to the next highest ranked eligible athlete at the 2020 World Surfing Games.
 2019 World Surf League Championship Tour – the 10 highest ranked men and 8 highest ranked women will be awarded quota places.
 2019 ISA World Surfing Games – the top finishers from each continent with the exception of the Americas will be awarded a quota place.
 2019 Pan American Games – the top finisher in men's and women's events will be awarded a quota place.
 2021 ISA World Surfing Games – the top 4 men and 6 women will be awarded quota places.  If a NOC or National Olympic Committee qualifies more than the maximum number of athletes, the 2021 ISA World Surfing Games will prevail and any places earned from 2019 will be reawarded to the next highest finishing athlete(s).
There is a maximum of 2 men and 2 women per NOC.

Timeline

Competition schedule

Dates are tentative.  Competition will take place over 4 days between 25 July and 1 August, subject to wave conditions.

Finals advanced to 27 July from 28 July, to take advantage of waves caused by Tropical Storm Nepartak.

Medal summary

Medal table

Events

See also
Surfing at the 2019 Pan American Games

References

External links
 Surfing at the Tokyo 2020 Olympics official website 
 Results book 

 
2020
2020 Summer Olympics events
Olympics
Summer Olympics